Sverre Horge (born 10 May 1944) is a Norwegian actor. He has acted in many Norwegian films and TV series. He is best known for playing the role of Sverre in the popular Norwegian Christmas series Nissene på Låven on (TV Norge).

Horge has also been a guest on many other popular TV shows, such as Tonight med Timothy Dahle, Melonas, Seks som oss, Senkveld med Thomas og Harald.
When Håvard Lilleheie began The Man Show in 2006 Horge was one of the actors, both in the role of Emil'''s father, and the character of Rolf "Ni-seks" Hansen.
In 2007, he played the main role in the animated film, Janus which won the Amanda Prize for best short film.

Horge has acted in many Norwegian films since the 1970s. He has often appeared alongside the duo Wam and Vennerød, and can be seen in films such as Det tause flertall, Hvem har bestemt? and Liv og død.

FilmographyUti vår hage 2 (2008) – Mann med røkebenJanus (short film) (2007) – JanusThe Man Show: Det beste fra sesong 1 og 2 (2007)Seks som oss (2005) – Egils kollegaTonight med Timothy Dahle (2003) – ToreNissene på Låven (2001) – Sverre BorgeElling (2001) – Mann på Valkyrien restaurantBlackout (1986) – ScenemesterLiv og død (1980) – GjenglederNedtur (1980) – UteliggerenPøbel (1980) – TomHvem har bestemt? (1978) – DrosjesjåførDet tause flertall (1977) – KollegaIngen roser, takk – SykehuspasientEddie og Suzanne (1975) – EddieThe Terrorists (a.k.a. Ransom) (1974) – Undercover PolicemanVoldtekt'' (1971) – Frank

External links
IMDb at Sverre Horge
Sverre Horge as Emil's father at 

1944 births
Living people
Place of birth missing (living people)
Norwegian male film actors
Norwegian male television actors